Vilhjálmur  or Vilhjalmur is an Icelandic masculine given name and may refer to:

Vilhjálmur Árnason (born 1953), professor of philosophy at the University of Iceland
Vilhjálmur Þórmundur Vilhjálmsson (born 1946), mayor of Reykjavík 2006–2007
Vilhjálmur Einarsson (1934–2019), former Icelandic athlete, and triple-jump Olympic silver medalist
Vilhjalmur Stefansson (1879–1962), Canadian Arctic explorer and ethnologist
Vilhjálmur Hólmar Vilhjálmsson (1945–1978), Icelandic musician and singer

Masculine given names
Icelandic masculine given names
Faroese masculine given names